Nasib bey Yusif bey oghlu Yusifbeyli or Usubbeyov (5 July 1881, Ganja - 31 May 1920) - Azerbaijani publicist, statesman and major political figure in Azerbaijan Democratic Republic.

Early years
Nasib bey Yusifbeyli was born in 1881 in Elisavetpol (present-day Ganja, Azerbaijan). After graduating from a gymnasium (secondary school) in Ganja, he enrolled as a student at the Law Faculty of the Novorossiya University (now the Odessa University) in 1902. When the university was temporarily shut down by the Tsarist Russian authorities due to revolutionary student activities, N. Yusifbeyli moved to Bakhchisarai in Crimea, where he started editing "Tercuman" newspaper with the Crimean Turkic intellectual Ismail Gasprinsky.

In 1908, Yusifbeyli moved to Istanbul, continuing on his work as a publicist and establishing the Turkic Society. In 1909, he returned to Elisavetpol to work at its city council.

In 1917, Yusifbeyli established the National Party of Turkic Federalists in Ganja, with the main goal of federalism in the Russian empire. In July 1917, the party joined the Musavat Muslim Democrat Party of Mammad Amin Rasulzade, and Yusifbeyli became Musavat's regional chair in Ganja.

Turkic Federalist Party 
After the merge, Yusifbeyli was nominated as a member of the Constituent Assembly of Russia, where he was elected from the Transcaucasian electoral district according to list No. 10 - the Muslim National Committee and Musavat. 

The dispersal of the Constituent Assembly by the Bolsheviks put an end to doubts about the possibility of establishing a parliamentary system in Russia under the Bolshevik government. This forced deputies from the South Caucasus to declare the non-recognition of the power of the Bolsheviks and the creation of their own regional power - the Transcaucasian Seim. The seats in this regional parliament were distributed among national parties. The second-largest faction in the Sejm was the Musavat Party faction. The head of the faction was M.E. Rasulzade and N. Yusifbeyli became one of his two deputies.

On May 27, 1918, at the meeting of former members of the Muslims of the Transcaucasian Seim, the National Council of Azerbaijan was established, which included Nasib Yusifbeyli. May 28, 1918, the first Azerbaijani government was created. Yusifbeyli appointed to the posts of Minister of Finance, Minister of Public Education and Religious Affairs.

Relations 
When he was the head of government, relations with Georgia were established as a result of the conclusion of a military agreement. When Yusifbeyli was a prime minister, relations were established with many European states. In January 1920, the Supreme Council of the Entente recognized the independence of Azerbaijan de facto.

Political career
When the short-lived Transcaucasian Democratic Federative Republic was established on 10 February 1918, N. Yusifbeyli became its Minister of Education. On 28 May 1918, when Azerbaijan Democratic Republic (ADR) was proclaimed, N. Yusifbeyli again held the cabinet post of Minister of Education in the ADR government. From March 1919 till March 1920, he was the Prime Minister of Azerbaijan, in parallel, also holding the post of the Minister of Interior from March till December 1919.

After the Bolshevik invasion of Azerbaijan and fall of ADR in April 1920, N. Yusifbeyli escaped from Baku but was murdered on 31 May 1920.

References

1881 births
1920 deaths
Azerbaijani Muslims
Politicians from Ganja, Azerbaijan
People from Elizavetpol Governorate
Russian Constituent Assembly members
Azerbaijan Democratic Republic politicians
Musavat politicians
Prime Ministers of Azerbaijan
Finance ministers of Azerbaijan
Education ministers of Azerbaijan
Azerbaijani nobility